As one of the best-selling artists worldwide the Backstreet Boys have received numerous awards and accolades in recognition of their worldwide success in the music industry. Below is the list of awards and nominations of the Backstreet Boys. The group has received nine Grammy Award nominations in total, including four in 2000 and their ninth nomination in 2018 for the 61st Grammy Awards taking place in February 2019.

Grammy Awards
The Grammy Awards are awarded annually by the National Academy of Recording Arts and Sciences. The Backstreet Boys have received 9 nominations, including Album of the Year, Record of the Year and Best New Artist. On December 7, 2018, the Backstreet Boys were nominated for the Grammy Award for Best Pop Duo/Group Performance.

|-
|rowspan="1"| 
|Backstreet Boys
| Best New Artist
|rowspan=9 
|-
|rowspan="5"| 
|rowspan="2"| Millennium
| Album of the Year
|-
| Best Pop Vocal Album
|-
|rowspan="3"| "I Want It That Way"
| Record of the Year
|-
| Song of the Year
|-
| Best Pop Performance by a Duo or Group with Vocals
|-
|rowspan="1"| 
|"Show Me the Meaning of Being Lonely"
| Best Pop Performance by a Duo or Group with Vocals
|-
|rowspan="1"| 
|"Shape of My Heart"
| Best Pop Performance by a Duo or Group with Vocals
|-
|rowspan="1"| 2019
|"Don't Go Breaking My Heart"
| Best Pop Duo/Group Performance
|}

1995
 Smash Hits Awards
 Best New Tour Act

1996
 Bravo Otto
 Gold Pop Group
 Goldene Kamera
 Best Boyband
 MTV Europe Music Awards
 MTV Select: "Get Down (You're the One For Me)"
 Viva Comet Awards
 Durchstarter (Best Newcomers)
 The Shooting Star of the Year

1997
 Bravo Otto
 Gold Pop Group
 MTV Europe Music Awards
 Select: "As Long As You Love Me"
 Viva Comet Awards
 Durchstarter (Best Newcomers)

1998
 Billboard Music Awards
 Group Album of the Year: "Backstreet Boys"
 Bravo Otto
 Gold Pop Group
 ECHO awards
 Best International Group
 MuchMusic Video Awards
 Peoples Choice Favorite International Group
 MTV Video Music Awards
 Best Group Video: "Everybody (Backstreet's Back)"
 Smash Hits Poll Winners Awards
 Best Non-British Act
 TMF Awards (Nertherlands)
 Best international album: "Backstreet Boys"
 Best international single: "As Long as You Love Me"
 Best international live act
 Viva Comet Awards
 Durchstarter (Best Newcomers)
 World Music Awards
 World's Best-selling Dance Artist

1999
 American Music Awards
 Favorite Pop/Rock Band, Duo or Group
 Billboard Music Awards
 Album of the Year: Millennium
 Albums Artist Duo/Group of the Year
 Albums Artist of the Year
 Artist of the Year
 Blockbuster Entertainment Awards
 Favorite CD: Millennium
 Favorite Group - Pop
 Bravo Otto
 Silver Band
 MuchMusic Video Awards
 Peoples Choice Favorite International Group
 MTV Europe Music Awards
 Best Group
 MTV Video Music Awards
 Viewer's Choice: "I Want It That Way"
 Nickelodeon Kids Choice Awards
 Favorite Song: "Everybody (Backstreet's Back)"
 Smash Hits Poll Winners Awards
 Best Band on Planet Pop
 Best Non-British Band
 Best Single of 1999: "I Want It That Way"
 Best Album of 1999: "Millennium"
 Best Pop Video: "Larger than Life"
 Teen Choice Awards
 Choice Music Video of the Year: "All I Have To Give"
 Viva Comet Awards
 Zuschauer-Comet Viva (Viewers' Choice)
 World Music Awards
 World's Best-selling Pop Group

2000
 American Music Awards
 Favorite Pop/Rock Band, Duo or Group
 Bravo Otto
 Gold Pop Group
 Juno Award
 Best-selling Album (foreign or domestic): Millennium
 Nickelodeon Kids Choice Awards
 Favorite Music Group
 MTV Europe Music Awards
 Best Group
 People's Choice Awards
 Favorite Musical Group
 Teen Choice Awards
 Choice Album:   Millennium
 World Music Awards
 World's Best-selling American Group
 World's Best-selling Pop Group
 World's Best-selling R&B Group
 World's Best-selling Dance Artist
 Radio Music Awards
 Radio Slow Dance Song Of The Year: "Show Me the Meaning of Being Lonely"

2001
 American Music Awards
 Favorite Pop/Rock Band, Duo or Group
 MuchMusic Video Awards
 Peoples Choice Favorite International Group
 TMF Awards (Nertherlands)
 Best International Pop Group
 World Music Awards
 World's Best-selling Pop Group
 World's Best-selling American Group

2002
 RIAJ
 17th Japan Gold Disc Award 2002
 MTV Video Music Awards Japan
 Best Group
 MTV Asia Awards
 Favorite Video: "The Call"

2005
 Bravo Otto
 Bronze Pop Group

2006
 MTV Asia Awards
 Favourite Pop Act

2009
 Starshine Music Awards
 Best Live Show

2010
 Japan Gold Disc Award
 International Song of the Year: "Straight Through My Heart"
 Starshine Music Awards
 Best Dance Song: "Straight Through My Heart"
 Best Pop Song: "Bigger"
 Favorite Band/Group
 Best Live Show
 Song of the Year: "Straight Through My Heart"
 Album Of The Year: "This Is Us"
 Artist of the Year

2011
 NewNowNext Awards
 Best New Indulgence: New Kids On The Block/Backstreet Boys – Summer Tour 2011

2013
 Hollywood Walk of Fame
 Star on the Walk of Fame

2014
 MTV Movie Awards
 Best Musical Moment

2015
 Kentucky Music Hall of Fame - Kevin Richardson and Brian Littrell

2018
 CMT Music Awards
CMT Music Award for CMT Performance of the Year

2019
Viña del Mar International Song Festival
 "Gaviota de Plata" (Silver Seagull) and "Gaviota de Oro" (Golden Seagull)
MTV Video Music Awards
Best Group (nominated)

References

Awards
Lists of awards received by American musician
Lists of awards received by musical group